OCC may refer to:

American colleges
 Oakland Community College, Michigan
 Oakton Community College, Illinois
 Ocean County College, New Jersey
 Onondaga Community College, New York
 Orange Coast College, California
 Ozark Christian College, Missouri

Business and government
 Office of the Comptroller of the Currency, a bureau of the U.S. Treasury Department
 Office of Child Care, a part of the U.S. Department of Health and Human Services
 Oklahoma Corporation Commission, public utilities commission of Oklahoma
 Online Compliance Consortium, a regulatory compliance forum for top law firms
 Opportunity cost of capital in finance
 Optical Cable Corporation, a manufacturer of fiber optic and copper datacom cabling and connectivity products
 Options Clearing Corporation, a clearing organization
 Organic composition of capital, a theory in Marxian economics  
 Osborne Computer Corporation, an American computer company

Computing
 Occasionally connected computing
 Optimistic concurrency control
 On-chip controller, a power and thermal monitoring component of the IBM's POWER8 processor

Sports
 OC Châteaudun, French association football club
 Oceania Club Championship, an international club competition organised by the Oceania Football Confederation
 Oceania Cycling Confederation, Oceania's branch of the Union Cycliste Internationale
 Ohio Capital Conference 
 Ohio Cardinal Conference
 Optimists Cricket Club of central Luxembourg
 Ottawa Curling Club of Canada

Other uses
 Ocean Cruising Club, a UK-based organisation for long-distance yacht cruisers
 Officer Candidates Course, a United States Marine Corps training program
 Official Charts Company, a UK-based company compiling various official UK music record charts 
 Ohno continuous casting, a special process to produce oxygen-free copper
 Old Corrugated Cardboard, a fiber grade separated in a materials recovery facility
 Onnuri Community Church, a South Korean megachurch
 Ontario Crafts Council, a Canadian nonprofit arts service organization based in Toronto
 Open Cloud Consortium, a non-profit organization
 Operation Christmas Child, an outreach program run by Samaritan's Purse
 Operations Control Center
 Orange County, California
 Orange County Choppers, a custom motorcycle manufacturer
 Oregon Convention Center, a convention center in Portland, Oregon
 The Oxford Companion to Chess
 Science Communication Observatory
Francisco de Orellana Airport IATA code
OOO Combo Change Series, a series of Kamen Rider OOO action figures